Lonnes is a commune in the Charente department in southwestern France.

Geography
The commune is located in the north of the Charente.

The surrounding communities are, in alphabetical order: Aunac, Chenon, Fontenille, Juillé, Salles-de-Villefagnan and Verteuil-sur-Charente. In addition to the town of Lonnes, the commune has several villages: les Maisons Rouges, les Essarts, le Petit Fayolle et le Grand Fayolle.

History 
In the Middle Ages, the monks of Nanteuil Abbey were lords of individual communes. In 1172, they ceded some of their land to the abbey of Grosbot, to build a church. Towards the middle of the 17th-century the population had increased, and a parish was created. The Saint Bartholomew church, slightly larger, was damaged by the Protestants. It was the subject of renovation in 1888–1889.

Population

Administration

Mayors
1896 -1904 Pierre Bastier
1904 -1919 Jean Bastier
1919 -1925 Jean Marifat
1925 -1944 Jean Mathieu
1944 -1960 Louis Ravion
1960 -1965 Anselme Migaud
1965 -1971 Jean-Louis Delhoume
1971 - Pierre Chaussepied

See also
Communes of the Charente department

References

Communes of Charente